Vatal Madappa Nagaraj is an Indian Politician who was the Member of the Karnataka Legislative Assembly from Chamarajnagar. president of the Kannada Chaluvali Vatal Paksha.      

In 1964 he led a two-month agitation demanding the destruction of a 150-year-old British Raj era cenotaph pillar marking the deaths of soldiers at the Siege of Bangalore in 1791. In October of that year the cenotaph was dismantled by the Bangalore City Corporation and a statue to Kempe Gowda now stands in its place.

Nagaraj served in the Karnataka Legislative Assembly until being defeated by C Guru Swamy in 2004.

He protested in 2017 against the comments of a famous South Indian actor Sathyaraj during the Cauvery Protest by Tamil Nadu Actors Association against Karnataka. He also protest against all who speaks against kannada, Karnataka. The protest was called off latter. In 2018 he started a new agitation on January 25 for water sharing from Mandovi River flowing from Goa. Some political critiques question the authenticity of Vatal's fight against Goa State for water sharing when he himself fight against Tamil Nadu government for Supreme court order to release water in Cauvery river.

References

Living people
1939 births